Relationship-based Pricing (RBP) is a pricing and billing framework in the banking industry where pricing is determined based on a customer's overall purchases and circumstances, rather than being delivered on a product-by-product basis. With RBP, banks use customer-based parameters, such as the level of overall business the customer does with a bank or the types of services purchased, to determine pricing.

Financial services industry analysts like Celent and TowerGroup endorse relationship-based pricing to improve profitability. 

RBP billing products include ORMB from Oracle Corporation, miRevenue from Zafin, and Xelerate from SunTec.

Implementation 

Leading banks and insurance companies in the United States and Europe have adopted RBP by implementing billing engines available from various product vendors. In 2013, California-based Bank of the West began an RBP project using Zafin Labs software

See also

Demand-based pricing
Dynamic pricing 
Premium pricing or Price premium 
Pricing
Pricing science
Pricing strategies
Time-based pricing
Value pricing or Value-based purchasing

References

Pricing